Mackenzie Alaina Roark (born June 16, 1989) is an American softball coach and former player. She is the former head coach at Ohio.

Career
She attended Mount Juliet High School in Mount Juliet, Tennessee. She later attended Virginia Tech, where she pitched for the Virginia Tech Hokies softball team. During her freshman season in 2008, Roark led the Hokies to the 2008 Women's College World Series, where they lost to Florida, 2–0.

Coaching career
After graduating from Virginia Tech, Roark later went on to serve as an assistant softball coach at Virginia Tech, East Tennessee State, and USC. Roark was named head softball coach at Ohio on August 25, 2018. On July 18, 2022, Roark announced her retirement from coaching after serving as head coach at Ohio for four seasons.

Head coaching record

References

External links
 
 Ohio bio
 Virginia Tech bio
 East Tennessee State bio

1989 births
Living people
American softball coaches
Ohio Bobcats softball coaches
Virginia Tech Hokies softball coaches
Virginia Tech Hokies softball players
Sportspeople from Nashville, Tennessee